The Enterprise Center is an office skyscraper located in Makati, Philippines. It is owned and developed by KSA Realty Corporation, a joint venture between the Kuok Group (majority shareholder), ING, and A. Soriano Corporation (ANSCOR). The taller Tower I of the complex stands at 171.9 metres (564 feet) and is currently the 74th tallest building in the Philippines.

Design
Hong Kong - based Wong & Tung International Limited (WTIL) is behind The Enterprise Center, in collaboration with ARADS & Associates, the local architect of The Enterprise Center.

By night, high intensity beams bathe the crowns in light.

Location
The Enterprise Center, specifically Tower 1, is located at the corner of Ayala Avenue and Paseo de Roxas Avenue, while Tower 2 faces Dela Rosa Street. The center is situated at the heart of the business and finance district.

Amenities
The building has multiple entrances and exits, speeding up arrival and departure from the seven-level underground parking facility. The parking levels can accommodate over 1,200 vehicles for both tenants and visitors. A new bike stand is also provided, and is located at the Basement 1 parking area just at the back of the Drop Off staircase at Tower 2.

The tower is equipped with a helipad, and a private lounge one level below the helipad.

The fourth floor houses a  International Food Court which serves a wide variety of cuisine. There are 25 outlets serving both building tenants and visitors.

Also available is a business center.

References

External links 
The Enterprise Center Tower 1 at Emporis
The Enterprise Center Tower 1 at Skyscraperpage.com
Location Map of The Enterprise Center Tower 1 at Ayala Maps

Skyscrapers in Makati
Skyscraper office buildings in Metro Manila
Office buildings completed in 1999
1999 establishments in the Philippines